The Southwick–Daniels Farm is a historic farm in Blackstone, Massachusetts.  The farmstead was established c. 1750, when the oldest portion of the main farmhouse was built, and has been in the same family since 1797.  This house portion is now the ell of the main house, which was built c. 1830.  There are three other buildings that date to the 19th century: the barn (c. 1850), the henhouse (c. 1830), and the cider mill (c. 1870).   Other important aspects of the farm's landscape are its stone walls, well houses and a corn crib.

The farm was listed on the National Register of Historic Places in 1995.  It is now a living history museum operated by the Daniels Farmstead Foundation.

See also
National Register of Historic Places listings in Worcester County, Massachusetts

References

External links
 Daniels Farmstead Foundation - official site

Houses completed in 1793
Historic districts in Worcester County, Massachusetts
National Register of Historic Places in Worcester County, Massachusetts
Houses in Worcester County, Massachusetts
Historic house museums in Massachusetts
Museums in Worcester County, Massachusetts
Historic districts on the National Register of Historic Places in Massachusetts
Farms on the National Register of Historic Places in Massachusetts
Buildings and structures in Blackstone, Massachusetts